Robert Joseph "Bobby Joe" Esposito is a retired American soccer forward who played professionally in the Western Soccer Alliance, Major Indoor Soccer League and National Professional Soccer League.

Youth
In 1983, Esposito graduated from Riverside High School.  During his four year high school career, Esposito scored 150 goals and went to three New Jersey High School soccer championships.  In 2003, Riverside inducted Esposito into its Hall of Fame.  Esposito attended Rutgers University, playing on the men's soccer team from 1983 to 1986.  He was a 1986 All American and is in second place on the school's career goals and points lists and fourth on the career assists list.  In 1999, Rutgers inducted Esposito into the school's Hall of Fame.

Professional
In 1987, the Cleveland Force selected Esposito in the third round of the Major Indoor Soccer League draft.  When the Force folded in 1988, he moved to the Los Angeles Lazers.  The Lazers folded a year later.  On July 11, 1989, the Dallas Sidekicks selected Esposito in the first round of the dispersal draft, but he chose to join the Lazer's coach, Keith Tozer, in a move to the Atlanta Attack of the National Professional Soccer League instead.  He also spent the 1989 outdoor season with the California Kickers of the Western Soccer Alliance. In 1992, the Spirit traded Esposito to the Kansas City Attack in exchange for a 1993 draft choice.  In 1994, Esposito retired and moved his family to New Jersey.  In 1995, he decided to return to professional soccer, so he signed with the Baltimore Spirit.  In 1997, the Philadelphia KiXX purchased Esposito's contract from the Spirit.  Esposito retired in 2000 but spent the 2000-2001 season as an assistant coach with the KiXX.

Retirement
After Bobby-Joe Esposito's great professional soccer career he retired and moved to New Jersey to be with his family. He has 3 great children, Gabrielle(the oldest), Caleb(the middle child), and Rachel(the youngest). His wife's name is Ruth. He still is playing indoor, but just for a small fun league. He also coaches Caleb and Rachel on their soccer teams.

References

External links

 MISL stats

Living people
1964 births
American soccer players
American soccer coaches
Atlanta Attack players
Baltimore Spirit players
California Kickers players
Cleveland Force (original MISL) players
Kansas City Attack players
Los Angeles Lazers players
Major Indoor Soccer League (1978–1992) players
National Professional Soccer League (1984–2001) players
Rutgers Scarlet Knights men's soccer players
Philadelphia KiXX players
Western Soccer Alliance players
Association football forwards
Sportspeople from Burlington County, New Jersey
Soccer players from New Jersey
National Professional Soccer League (1984–2001) coaches